Nathan Crepaldi da Cruz, simply known as Nathan (born 28 May 1999), is a Brazilian professional footballer who plays as a forward for Bosnian club Sloboda Novi Grad.

Honours
Sarajevo
Bosnian Premier League: 2018–19, 2019–20
Bosnian Cup: 2018–19

References

External links

1999 births
Living people
Brazilian footballers
Brazilian expatriate footballers
Brazilian expatriate sportspeople in Bosnia and Herzegovina
Expatriate footballers in Bosnia and Herzegovina
Association football forwards
Premier League of Bosnia and Herzegovina players
FK Sarajevo players
FK Olimpik players